Navarinou Square  is a square in the city of Thessaloniki in Greece. It is named after the Battle of Navarino, a crucial battle of the Greek War of Independence.

History
The square dates back to the Roman period of the city, with the ruins of the palace of Galerius located within it. The square is beside the "Hippodromus Square", the ancient site of Hippodrome where the Massacre of Thessalonica took place during the reign of Theodosius I.

Today Navarinou is a popular meeting place, mainly amongst the student population of the city.

Gallery

References 

Roman Thessalonica
Buildings and structures in Thessaloniki
Squares in Thessaloniki
Tourist attractions in Thessaloniki